Bernardo Navagero (Venice 1507 – 13 April 1565 Verona) was a Venetian ambassador and a cardinal of the Roman Catholic Church.

Life
Venetian patrician, son of Gianluigi Navagero and Lucrezia Agostini, he studied at the University of Padua. He married Istriana Lando, granddaughter of the doge Pietro Lando, but she died young.

He was Venetian resident ambassador at the courts of emperor Charles V (1543–46), Suleiman the Magnificent (1550-52) and pope Paul IV (1555–58), and he attended the Council of Ten (1552).

On 26 February 1561 he was named cardinal by pope Pius IV, and he was bishop of Verona from 1562  until his death. In 1563 he was legatus a latere at the council of Trent.

He died in Verona on 13 April 1565, leaving his episcopate to his nephew Agostino Valier.

External links
 Salvador Miranda, The Cardinals of the Holy Roman Church, Navagero, Bernardo; retrieved: 5 July 2020.
 Relazione of Bernardo Navagero, Venetian ambassador at the court of Charles V (1546)  
Despatches of Bernardo Navagero, Venetian ambassador in Rome, 1555-1558  
 

1507 births
1565 deaths
Republic of Venice clergy
16th-century Italian cardinals
Republic of Venice diplomats
16th-century Venetian people
16th-century Italian Roman Catholic bishops
Bishops of Verona